A mirror galvanometer is an ammeter that indicates it has sensed an electric current by deflecting a light beam with a mirror.  The beam of light projected on a scale acts as a long massless pointer.  In 1826, Johann Christian Poggendorff developed the mirror galvanometer for detecting electric currents. The apparatus is also known as a spot galvanometer after the spot of light produced in some models.

Mirror galvanometers were used extensively in scientific instruments before reliable, stable electronic amplifiers were available.  The most common uses were as recording equipment for seismometers and submarine cables used for telegraphy.

In modern times, the term mirror galvanometer is also used for devices that move laser beams by rotating a mirror through a galvanometer set-up, often with a servo-like control loop. The name is often abbreviated as galvo.

Kelvin's galvanometer 

The mirror galvanometer was improved significantly by William Thomson, later to become Lord Kelvin. He coined the term mirror galvanometer and patented the device in 1858. Thomson intended the instrument to read weak signal currents on very long submarine telegraph cables. This instrument was far more sensitive than any which preceded it, enabling the detection of the slightest defect in the core of a cable during its manufacture and submersion.  

Thomson decided that he needed an extremely sensitive instrument after he took part in the failed attempt to lay a transatlantic telegraph cable in 1857.  He worked on the device while waiting for a new expedition the following year.  He first looked at improving a galvanometer used by Hermann von Helmholtz to measure the speed of nerve signals in 1849.  Helmholtz's galvanometer had a mirror fixed to the moving needle, which was used to project a beam of light onto the opposite wall, thus greatly amplifying the signal.  Thomson intended to make this more sensitive by reducing the mass of the moving parts, but in a flash of inspiration while watching the light reflected from his monocle suspended around his neck, he realised that he could dispense with the needle and its mounting altogether.  He instead used a small piece of mirrored glass with a small piece of magnetised steel glued on the back.  This was suspended by a thread in the magnetic field of the fixed sensing coil.  In a hurry to try the idea, Thomson first used a hair from his dog, but later used a silk thread from the dress of his niece Agnes.

The following is adapted from a contemporary account of Thomson's instrument:

Moving coil galvanometer 

Moving coil galvanometer was developed independently by Marcel Deprez and  Jacques-Arsène d'Arsonval about 1880. Deprez's galvanometer was developed for high currents, while D'Arsonval designed his to measure weak currents. Unlike in the Kelvin's galvanometer, in this type of galvanometer the magnet is stationary and the coil is suspended in the magnet gap. The mirror attached to the coil frame rotates together with it. This form of instrument can be more sensitive and accurate and it replaced the Kelvin's galvanometer in most applications. The moving coil galvanometer is practically immune to ambient magnetic fields. Another important feature is self-damping generated by the electro-magnetic forces due to the currents induced in the coil by its movements the magnetic field. These are proportional to the angular velocity of the coil.

Modern uses 

In modern times, high-speed mirror galvanometers are employed in laser light shows to move the laser beams and produce colorful geometric patterns in fog around the audience. Such high speed mirror galvanometers have proved to be indispensable in industry for laser marking systems for everything from laser etching hand tools, containers, and parts to batch-coding semiconductor wafers in semiconductor device fabrication. They typically control X and Y directions on Nd:YAG and CO2 laser markers to control the position of the infrared power laser spot. Laser ablation, laser beam machining and wafer dicing are all industrial areas where high-speed mirror galvanometers can be found.

This moving coil galvanometer is mainly used to measure very feeble or low currents of order 10−9 A.

To linearise the magnetic field across the coil throughout the galvanometer's range of movement, the d'Arsonval design of a soft iron cylinder is placed inside the coil without touching it. This gives a consistent radial field, rather than a parallel linear field.

See also 

String galvanometer

References

Further reading

External links 

 Mirror Galvanometer - Interactive Java Tutorial National High Magnetic Field Laboratory

Galvanometers
Optical instruments